Martin Emmrich and Andreas Siljeström were the defending champions but decided not to participate.
Tomasz Bednarek and Mateusz Kowalczyk won the final against Harri Heliövaara and Denys Molchanov 7–5, 6–7(1–7), [10–8].

Seeds

Draw

Draw

References
 Main Draw

Sparkassen Open - Doubles
2012 Doubles